Chudoba may refer to:
Anna Chudoba, Polish-born model
Chudoba, Greater Poland Voivodeship, a village in west-central Poland
Chudoba, Gmina Byczyna, a village in Opole Voivodeship (south-west Poland)
Chudoba, Gmina Lasowice Wielkie (German Kudoba), another village in Opole Voivodeship